Verkhneye Borodkino is a rural locality (a village) in Shemogodskoye Rural Settlement, Velikoustyugsky District, Vologda Oblast, Russia. The population was 6 as of 2002.

Geography 
Verkhneye Borodkino is located 12 km southeast of Veliky Ustyug (the district's administrative centre) by road. Chernakovo is the nearest rural locality.

References 

Rural localities in Velikoustyugsky District